Abdihakim Mohamoud Haji-Faqi, also spelled Abdulhakim Mahamud Fiqi, is a Somali diplomat and politician. He twice served as the Minister of Defence of Somalia.

Personal life
Haji-Faqi hails from the Bay region in southern Somalia. He belongs to the Tunni sub group of the Rahanweyn clan.

Haji-Faqi was previously a diplomat in Canada.

Career
On 12 November 2010, Haji-Faqi was appointed Minister of Defence of Somalia. He was also serving as one of three national Vice President of Somalia (or in other words Deputy Prime Minister). His term as Defence Minister came to an end on 20 July 2011.

On 4 November 2012, Haji-Faqi was appointed Minister of Defence for a second time by the new Prime Minister, Abdi Farah Shirdon.

Among his first initiatives in office, Haji-Faqi led negotiations helping to secure the Arab League's support for the Somali federal government's campaign to end the longstanding arms embargo on Somalia. The blockade was eventually lifted on 6 March 2013, following the United Nations Security Council's unanimous adoption of Resolution 2093.

Haji-Faqi's second term as Minister of Defence ended on 17 January 2014, when new Prime Minister Abdiweli Sheikh Ahmed appointed Mohamed Sheikh Hassan as his successor.

References

Living people
Defence Ministers of Somalia
Government ministers of Somalia
Ethnic Somali people
Somalian emigrants to Canada
Year of birth missing (living people)